Brian Malouf (born September 8, 1955) is an American producer, engineer, and mixer who has worked with acts such as Michael Jackson, Queen, Madonna, Pearl Jam, Stevie Wonder, Dave Matthews Band, Tokio Hotel, Wolfmother, and All Time Low. Also serving as an executive at several major record labels over the years, his work has amassed a total of 53 gold, platinum, and double platinum records to date.

Early life
Malouf grew up in Los Angeles, playing drums from a young age. In high school he experimented with instruments such as the trombone and upright bass, writing for the school's big band, but he returned to his percussive roots when he attended Cal State Northridge, where he was serving as the first-chair symphonic percussionist in the orchestra by the time he graduated. After his fifth year Malouf, weary of counting rests in the classical repertoire, left school and began playing drum set again in noted LA rock band Giant City. He later began doing sound engineering for live bands at night, apprenticing for engineer Dave Jerden during the day.

Musical career
In 1981, Malouf went to work for Can-Am Recorders in Tarzana, California, where he'd been working for several years when he first met Michael Jackson. One day, while the Jacksons were recording there, Michael asked if Malouf would like to engineer for him that evening. Said Malouf to Mix Magazine: "He came to me on one of their sessions and said, 'Hey Brian, I want to come back tonight and do my own stuff. Can you do it with me?' And that was the beginning of working with him for a year and a half..." The songs they recorded together would eventually comprise the Bad album.

By 1990, Malouf had risen to the top of his field as a mix engineer, working with Madonna, Queen, Hall & Oates, and Smokey Robinson in the same year, and continuing to grow his high-profile clientele list. In 1994 he was offered the position of vice-president of A&R at RCA Records in New York, where he remained for eleven years while continuing to mix and produce. Working for various labels over the years as a consultant and senior A&R executive, including a three-year run as the VP of A&R at Walt Disney Records, he now owns Cookie Jar Recording in Sherman Oaks, California. He is managed by Andrew Brightman at Brightman Music.

Selected discography

References

External links
Cookie Jar Recording

Living people
Record producers from California
21st-century American engineers
1955 births